Elaeocarpus williamsianus, commonly known as hairy quandong, is a species of flowering plant in the family Elaeocarpaceae and is endemic to a restricted area of north-eastern New South Wales. It is a small tree with lance-shaped leaves, racemes of greenish-white flowers and spherical blue fruit.

Description
Its young branchlets are densely covered with woolly, rust-coloured hairs. The leaves sometimes have eight to ten pairs of inconspicuous teeth on the edges. There are thirty to thirty-eight stamens and the ovary is covered with silvery hairs.

Taxonomy
Elaeocarpus williamsianus was first formally described in 1983 by Gordon Paul Guymer in the journal Telopea from specimens collected near Burringbar in 1980. The specific epithet (williamsianus) honours John Beaumont Williams of the University of New England.

Distribution and habitat
Hairy quandong is restricted to nine sites on the Burringbar Range in the far north-east of New South Wales, where it grows in warm temperate rainforest, including in disturbed areas where it has regrown from root suckers.

Conservation status
This quandong is very rare and at least six of the nine populations are clones and produce few seeds. The species is listed as "endangered" under the Australian Government Environment Protection and Biodiversity Conservation Act 1999 and the New South Wales Government Biodiversity Conservation Act 2016. A recovery plan has been prepared. The main threats to the species include habitat clearing and fragmentation, weed invasion, and the species limited genetic diversity.

References

williamsianus
Oxalidales of Australia
Trees of Australia
Endangered flora of Australia
Flora of New South Wales
Plants described in 1983